Miles Law School is a law school located in Birmingham, Alabama. It is independent of Miles College.

Miles Law School was founded on August 26, 1974.  Among the founders were Bishop C. A. Kirkendoll of the C.M.E. Church, Dr. W. Clyde Williams, former president of Miles College, former Alabama Judge and state Senator J. Richmond Pearson, and Morris Dees, founder of the Southern Poverty Law Center.

Program of Study
The school offers a four-year part-time evening program. Graduates of the law school receive the Juris Doctor. Of the 31 Miles alumni who took the Alabama bar exam in February 2020, none passed.

Accreditation
Miles Law School is not accredited by the American Bar Association. It is one of two unaccredited law schools in Alabama, the other being the Birmingham School of Law.  Miles Law graduates are however eligible to take the Alabama Bar Exam pursuant to the authority granted by the Alabama Legislature and the Alabama Supreme Court.

Notable alumni
 William A. Bell, Mayor of Birmingham
 Bobby Singleton, Alabama State Senator
 Carole Smitherman, former Mayor of Birmingham, current Circuit Court Judge
 Rodger Smitherman, Alabama State Senator
 Danny Carr, District attorney of Jefferson County, Alabama

References

External links

Law schools in Alabama
Educational institutions established in 1974
1974 establishments in Alabama